Luke Del Rio (born November 6, 1994) is an American football coach and former quarterback who is an assistant coach for the Washington Commanders of the National Football League (NFL). He played college football at the University of Alabama, Oregon State University, and University of Florida. Del Rio is the son of Jack Del Rio.

Early years
The son of Jack Del Rio, Luke was born in Minneapolis, Minnesota, on November 6, 1994. He attended Episcopal School of Jacksonville in Jacksonville, Florida, while his father was the head coach of the Jacksonville Jaguars, and transferred to Valor Christian High School in Highlands Ranch, Colorado, for his senior year after his father was hired by the Denver Broncos in 2012. Del Rio passed for 2,275 yards with 28 touchdowns in his senior year.

College career

Alabama 
Del Rio joined the University of Alabama as a walk-on in 2013.

Oregon State 
After redshirting that season, Del Rio transferred to Oregon State University for 2014. He appeared in three games that season as a backup to Sean Mannion, completing 8 of 18 passes for 141 yards.

Florida 
After the season, Del Rio transferred to the University of Florida. According to a university spokesperson, Del Rio was granted an extra year of eligibility by the NCAA in 2015. The extra year made him a redshirt sophomore for the 2016 season.

After sitting out 2015 due to transfer rules, Del Rio was named the starting quarterback for Florida in 2016. In the third game of the year against North Texas, Del Rio suffered a knee injury on a blindside hit, which forced Del Rio to miss the next two games. He had also suffered an AC joint sprain in his throwing shoulder earlier in the North Texas game, which hampered his play when he returned from injury. Del Rio returned from injury to play against Missouri on October 15. A week later in a game against Georgia, he suffered a torn labrum in his non-throwing shoulder. After struggling in a 31–10 loss against Arkansas on November 5, Del Rio was finally shutdown for the season due to injuries. After undergoing surgery on both shoulders, he was sidelined for all of spring practice in 2017.

Del Rio began the 2017 season behind starter Feleipe Franks and top backup Malik Zaire. With the offense struggling against Kentucky, Del Rio came off the bench and led the Gators to a comeback victory. As a result, Del Rio was named the starting quarterback the following week against Vanderbilt. In the second quarter, Del Rio suffered a broken collarbone and was ruled out for the rest of the season. In November 2017, Del Rio announced that he would be forgoing his sixth and final year of eligibility.

Statistics

Coaching career
In 2019, Del Rio coached tight ends at Santa Margarita Catholic High School. In January 2020, Del Rio joined the Washington Football Team to be their offensive quality control coach. The move united him with his father Jack, who had joined the team as their defensive coordinator that season. He was promoted to assistant quarterbacks coach in 2022.

References

External links

Washington Commanders bio
Florida Gators bio
Oregon State Beavers bio

1994 births
Alabama Crimson Tide football players
American football quarterbacks
Living people
Florida Gators football players
Oregon State Beavers football players
Players of American football from Minneapolis
Players of American football from Florida
Players of American football from Colorado
Sports coaches from Minneapolis
Washington Commanders coaches
Washington Football Team coaches